Tybo is an unincorporated community in Nye County, Nevada, United States. The community was established in the 1870s as a silver mining town. Its name came from the Shoshone word tybbabo or tai-vu, meaning "white man's district". The community prospered in the 1870s; its population neared 1000, and it had a school, post office, and newspaper by the end of the decade. A variant is Tyboe found on Wheeler's map of 1871.

The Tybo Charcoal Kilns in Tybo are located on the National Register of Historic Places.

References

Unincorporated communities in Nye County, Nevada
Unincorporated communities in Nevada